Osmanthus delavayi is a species of flowering plant in the olive family Oleaceae. It is
an evergreen shrub native to the Guizhou, Sichuan and Yunnan regions of southern China, and widely cultivated as an ornamental in temperate and subtropical zones elsewhere.

History
Osmanthus delavayi was discovered by the Jesuit missionary-botanist Fr Pierre Jean Marie Delavay in the mountains near Lan-kong in Yunnan province, China, in 1890. He sent seed to the French nurseryman Vilmorin. Though Maurice de Vilmorin distributed the seed among various correspondents, only a single seed germinated. All the O. delavayi of European gardens were cloned from this one source, until George Forrest obtained further supplies of seed in China after World War I.

Description
Over several weeks in late winter to spring, Osmanthus delavayi bears fragrant flowers that are more prominent but less fragrant than Osmanthus fragrans, but substitutes for O. fragrans in less balmy gardens. The shrub currently holds an Award of Garden Merit  from the Royal Horticultural Society which it first received in 1923 and has been praised by British garden writers. It is a garden staple in the east coast of Australia as far south as Tasmania. Its USDA Zone range is 7-9 (it can survive -15C), making it hardy in sheltered locations as far north as coastal New York and in the Pacific Northwest.

Osmanthus × burkwoodii
O. × burkwoodii, a garden hybrid of Osmanthus decorus × Osmanthus delavayi, (syn. ×Osmarea burkwoodii)  is also a popular garden shrub, and has also won an Award of Garden Merit. It is named after the brothers Arthur and Albert Burkwood, 19th century hybridisers.

References

delavayi
Flora of Yunnan
Garden plants